Andreas Hestler (born May 12, 1970, in Victoria, British Columbia, Canada) is a Canadian professional racing cyclist. Hestler finished 31st in the Men's Mountain Bike Race at the 1996 Summer Olympics.  Hestler currently rides for Rocky Mountain Bicycles.

Major results 
2-Time Canadian Champion, 3-Time National Series Champion

2005
 2nd, Trans Alp Challenge (teammate Alison Sydor)
 1st, Trans Rockies Challenge

2004
 1st, Trans Rockies Challenge

2003
 2nd, Trans Rockies Challenge

1996
 31st, Olympic Men's Mountain Bike Race - XC

External links

1970 births
Living people
Canadian male cyclists
Cyclists at the 1996 Summer Olympics
Olympic cyclists of Canada
Sportspeople from Victoria, British Columbia